Stephen David Stubbings (born 31 March 1978) is an English cricketer and coach who played first-class and List A cricket for Derbyshire from 1998 to 2009 and minor counties cricket for Bedfordshire (2011–2013).

He only played a handful of senior games before trying out at the Frankston Peninsula Cricket Club in the Victorian Cricket Association's Premier Competition. He made his 1st XI debut in the 1995/1996 season before playing in England in the summer of 1997.

In 2016 Stubbings was appointed as Derbyshire's First Eleven coach.

References

1978 births
Living people
Swinburne University of Technology alumni
English cricketers
Bedfordshire cricketers
Derbyshire cricketers
Shropshire cricketers
English cricket coaches
Cricketers from Huddersfield
English cricketers of 1969 to 2000
English cricketers of the 21st century